There are 16 Important Bird Areas (IBAs) designated for Albania. The following is a list of Important Bird Areas in the country.

References